Maria Hall-Brown is an American journalist, television producer, and actor.

Journalism 

She is the host and producer of Bookmark with Maria Hall-Brown, a news magazine featuring interviews with book authors, and a producer and occasional correspondent on KOCE's Real Orange newscast.  Hall-Brown was a producer for Calworks: Steps Towards Success, which was nominated for a Los Angeles Area Emmy Award in 2003.  She was awarded a Golden Mike Award by the Radio and Television News Association of Southern California in 2007.

Acting 

Maria Hall-Brown starred alongside David Carradine in 1988's Open Fire and 1998's Light Speed.

Education and background 
Hall-Brown earned a BFA in Drama from UC Irvine in 1984.  Her birthday is January 23.

References 
 "Bookmark with Maria Hall-Brown", KOCE, 2005.  Accessed 1/23/2008.
 "Real Orange", KOCE, 2007.  Accessed 1/23/2008.
 "The 55th Annual Los Angeles Area Emmy Awards", Academy of Television Arts & Sciences, 2003.  Accessed 1/23/2008.
 "Maria Hall-Brown", IMDB.  Accessed 1/23/2008.
 "UCI Arts Quarterly", UC Irvine Claire Trevor School of the Arts, Spring 2007.

Footnotes 

American television journalists
Television producers from California
American women television producers
University of California, Irvine alumni
Living people
American women television journalists
Year of birth missing (living people)
21st-century American women